LDS Student Association (also known as the Latter-day Saint Student Association or the LDSSA) is an organization established under the direction of the Seminaries and Institutes of Religion of the Church of Jesus Christ of Latter-day Saints (LDS Church) to help students enrolled in post-secondary education to have a balanced secular and spiritual educational experience during their years of formal education.

The Encyclopedia of Mormonism states:
	
The purposes of LDSSA are to help college and university students stay closely affiliated with the Church, succeed in their studies, and achieve a balanced educational-social life while on campus; to motivate LDS students to become a powerful influence for good on the campus; to provide meaningful activities that are consistent with Church standards; and to coordinate Church-related activities for college students.

Each chapter of the LDSSA is affiliated with a post-secondary educational institution and the LDS Church. Membership is open to all students enrolled at the institution who espouse the purposes and standards of the LDSSA. Associate membership may be granted to non-students under special circumstances. Membership is not denied to anyone on the basis of race, religion, national origin, ethnicity, color, age, gender, marital status, citizenship, sexual orientation, veteran status, or disability. Some institute locations offer classes for students with learning disabilities or other special needs. Members must keep LDSSA standards at LDSSA-sponsored events, which are the standards of the LDS Church. These standards include, but are not limited to: no acts of sexual immorality, no alcohol consumption or tobacco usage, and no immodest attire.

History
The LDSSA was established in 1960, and today a chapter of the LDSSA exists in many locations where an Institute of Religion of the Church Educational System has been established. The Institute of Religion Advisory Council, with counsel from the faculty advisor(s), provide advice/guidance to the LDSSA and its members. One of the first LDSSA chapters was organized at the Logan Institute of Religion located adjacent to Utah State University.

LDSSA chapters at some schools (for example, Harvard College) are not formally and directly governed by the LDS Church, as a result of official school requirements mandating the "local autonomy" of recognized campus organizations. However, they still interact with the local Institutes of Religion and church organization structure in ways similar to those of other LDSSA chapters. One key difference is that such LDSSA chapters hold elections for their president and other board officers, rather than those officers being nominated by the Institute of Religion Advisory Council.

Two key figures in establishing the LDSSA were W. Rolfe Kerr and Elaine A. Cannon.

See also
Single adult (LDS Church)
College religious organizations

References

External links
Institute finder: find an Institute of Religion and a local chapter of the LDSSA

Church Educational System
Student societies in the United States
Young people and the Church of Jesus Christ of Latter-day Saints
Christian organizations established in 1960
Student organizations established in 1960
Student religious organizations in the United States
Organizational subdivisions of the Church of Jesus Christ of Latter-day Saints
1960 establishments in Utah